Lewis Roberts may refer to:
 Lewis Roberts (snooker player) (born 1985), English snooker player
 Lewis Roberts (naturalist) (born 1950), naturalist and botanical illustrator

See also
Louis Roberts, Canadian politician
Lewis Roberts-Thomson (born 1983), Australian football player